Lough Feeagh is a freshwater lake in County Mayo, Ireland. It is the largest of the lakes in the Burrishoole catchment, which consists of seven lakes and interconnecting rivers and streams. Lough Feeagh is one of the lakes observed and studied by the Global Lake Ecological Observatory Network (GLEON).

Lough Feeagh drains into Lough Furnace, which then drains through the short Burrishoole Channel into Clew Bay.

See also
List of loughs in Ireland

References

External links
Global Lake Ecological Observatory Network: Feeagh
Global Lake Ecological Observatory Network: Information and photos (PDF)
Tageo.com: Information and map
Marine Institute of Ireland: Burrishoole Fishery

Feeagh